La Vie En Rose is the debut album by Japanese rock band D'erlanger, released on February 10, 1989. It was instantly successful, having to be reissued three times that year alone. The 1991 release reached number 25 on the Oricon Albums Chart and charted for 5 weeks.

Background and release
Having completed their final lineup in July 1988 with the joining of vocalist Kyo, D'erlanger began recording their first album in October. Drummer Tetsu later recalled that producer Masahiro Oishi threatened that if he took too long to record his drum parts, he would bring in Joe from 44Magnum to play them. La Vie En Rose was released on February 10, 1989 via Danger Crue Records. Its sound was a drastic departure from their previous material, being punk and alternative rock instead of the speed and power metal they originally had.

The first press sold out by pre-order alone, so another press was made just 11 days later, which had a different cover. That version was reissued one month later on March 21. On December 10, another press was released in two covers; the original and another new one. On April 21, 1991, one more different cover version was released that would become the cover used on all future reissues. La Vie En Rose was remastered, along with their second album Basilisk, and released on April 21, 1995. It, along with the rest of the band's albums, was remastered and released again on April 18, 2007.

The arrangement for all tracks is credited to guitarist Cipher, except "1999 -Shy Boy Story-", which is credited to Cipher and Jimmy of 44Magnum. A demo of "Sadistic Emotion" with original drummer Shi-Do and second vocalist Dizzy was previously released in 1987. A version of "Lullaby" titled "Lullaby -1990-" was released as a single on September 5, 1990, it included a ballad version of the song as a b-side.

Reception
Tomoyuki Hokari of OK Music described the music of La Vie En Rose as taking aspects from beat rock like Boøwy and mixing it with metal like 44Magnum. He called the lyrics written by Cipher "romantic", and those written by Kyo "decadent." Hokari wrote that every song on the album is catchy and "melodious", which he attributes to Cipher's "extraordinary" ability to create melodies.

Legacy
Hokari wrote that La Vie En Rose had considerable influence on future rock bands, particularly those in the visual kei scene. Dir en grey guitarist Die said he got his love of guitar from the album.

The title track of La Vie En Rose was reworked into "Bara Iro no Jinsei" for D'erlanger's second album Basilisk, which also included an acoustic arrangement of "I Can't Live Without You".

Mucc later covered "La Vie En Rose", featuring Kyo, for their 2006 Cover Parade album. The extended version of "An Aphrodisiac" originally on their 1990 single "Darlin'", and two different versions of "Lullaby", one titled original and another the ballad rendition from "Lullaby -1990-", appear on D'erlanger's 2007 greatest hits album Pandora. Their 2010 self-cover album A Fabulous Thing in Rose includes new re-recordings of "La Vie En Rose" (two versions, one being in English), "An Aphrodisiac" (two versions, one being a trance rock mix), "Lazy Sleazy",  and "Sadistic Emotion".

For 2017's D'erlanger Tribute Album ~Stairway to Heaven~, "Under the Pretense" was remixed by Yow-Row from Gari, "La Vie En Rose" was covered by Hyde featuring Cipher, Seela and Tetsu, "1999 -Shy Boy Story-" by The Slut Banks, "Sadistic Emotion" by Kiyoharu, "An Aphrodisiac" by Justy-Nasty, and "Lullaby" by a one-off group of Inoran, Teru, Hisashi, Pierre Nakano (Ling tosite Sigure) and Ery (Raglaia).

Track listing
All music composed by Cipher, except "Under the Pretense", composed by Cipher, Kyo and Poppo.

Personnel
D'erlanger
Kyo – vocals
Cipher – guitar
Seela – bass
Tetsu – drums

Other
 Mayumi "Poppo" Kaneko – keyboards
 Masahiro Oishi – producer, engineer
 Makoto Kondo – mastering

References

1989 debut albums
D'erlanger albums